Heribert Sperner (6 September 1915 – 28 April 1943) was an Austrian footballer.

References

1915 births
1943 deaths
Austrian footballers
Association football defenders
SK Rapid Wien players